Anthidium luizae is a species of bee in the family Megachilidae, the leaf-cutter, carder, or mason bees.

Distribution
Peru

References

luizae
Insects described in 2001